Guinness plc v Saunders [1989] UKHL 2 is a UK company law case, regarding the power of the company to pay directors. It required that whatever rules exist for payment in the company's articles, they must be strictly observed.

Facts
Guinness plc appointed a committee of three directors in January 1986, Ernest Saunders (the chairman), Olivier Roux and Tom Ward (who was an American attorney), to handle the company's affairs during a takeover bid for Distillers Company. Guinness was successful in its bid, though only after (among other things) Ward had been paid £5.2m. Ward claimed that this "fee" was agreed among the committee of three directors. Guinness plc's articles of association gave power to fix directors' remuneration to the whole board, which could then delegate any of its powers. It was not apparent that such power had ever been delegated.

Ward argued that the company's articles should be construed so that the committee could be vested with power to pay remuneration to its members. The new owners of Guinness plc argued that there had been no such power and the £5.2m had to be paid back.

Judgment
The House of Lords held that the power to pay remuneration under the articles of the company should be strictly followed.

Lord Templeman gave the leading judgment. He stated the following.

Lord Templeman then ruled that none of the other articles gave the committee the power to pay directors, Ward was not entitled to pay as any kind of professional as a solicitor. Mr Saunders, even though he was chairman, had no actual or ostensible authority to agree that Ward should be paid. Finally, because the articles had an express procedure for pay, there could be no claim for quantum meruit by the court.

Lord Keith, Lord Brandon and Lord Griffiths concurred.

Lord Goff gave a concurring opinion. He noted that a Boardman v Phipps type quantum meruit can be made only ‘where it cannot have the effect of encouraging trustees in any way to put themselves in a position where their interests conflict with their duties as trustees.’ His judgment went as follows.

See also
Ex parte James (1803) 8 Ves 337, Lord Eldon, ‘This doctrine as to purchases by trustees, assignees, and persons having a confidential character, stands much more upon general principle than upon the circumstances of any individual case. It rests upon this, that the purchase is not permitted in any case, however honest the circumstances, the general interests of justice requiring it to be destroyed in every instance; as no court is equal to the examination and ascertainment of the truth in much the greater number of cases.’ (see also, Ex parte Lacey (1802) 6 Ves 625)

Notes

References

English trusts case law
House of Lords cases
1990 in British law
1990 in case law